Matija Matko (born 20 September 1982) is a Croatian football player, who currently plays for German lower league side Dinamo München.

Club career
He is best known for his speed. In August 2008, he came to HNK Rijeka from HŠK Zrinjski Mostar, where he was one of the best players in the club. In 2010 Matko joined NK Inter Zaprešić.

References

External links
Matija Matko profile

1982 births
Living people
Footballers from Zagreb
Association football forwards
Croatian footballers
NK Hrvatski Dragovoljac players
NK Čelik Zenica players
PFC CSKA Sofia players
FK Sarajevo players
HŠK Zrinjski Mostar players
HNK Rijeka players
NK Inter Zaprešić players
NK Zvijezda Gradačac players
HNK Gorica players
NK Zagorec Krapina players
Croatian Football League players
Premier League of Bosnia and Herzegovina players
First Professional Football League (Bulgaria) players
Croatian expatriate footballers
Expatriate footballers in Bosnia and Herzegovina
Croatian expatriate sportspeople in Bosnia and Herzegovina
Expatriate footballers in Bulgaria
Croatian expatriate sportspeople in Bulgaria
Expatriate footballers in Germany
Croatian expatriate sportspeople in Germany